The Division Élite is the highest level of Baseball in France. Its clubs compete for the Championnat de France de baseball.

Organization 
It is an eight-team league that plays a 28-game schedule on weekends, with the season running from late March to early October. The top six teams qualify for the playoffs with the two first advancing directly to the semifinals. Teams ranked 3 to 6 play a best-of-five qualification for the semi-finals where they join the first two of the season. Semi-finals and finals are also played to the best-of-five. The league follows a promotion and relegation system where the last of the regular season gets to the Nationale 1 while the second-last play a barrage to the N1 finalist for a spot in the next Élite season.

Current Teams

Champions 
The Division Élite was created in 1926. Not all editions were held and some results are missing.

See also 
Baseball awards#France
Baseball awards#Europe

References

External links
  Official Site
  Results

France
Sports leagues established in 1926
1926 establishments in France